National Tertiary Route 608, or just Route 608 (or ) is a National Road Route of Costa Rica, located in the Puntarenas province.

Description
In Puntarenas province the route covers Corredores canton (Corredor, Laurel districts).

References

Highways in Costa Rica